Jean McBride was appointed to the Provincial Court of Manitoba on June 18, 2008, filling an opening in Portage la Prairie.

Judge McBride studied law at the University of Manitoba, graduating in 1998.  From her graduation until her appointment to the bench, she practiced as a provincial Crown attorney.  She worked for six years with the domestic violence unit, and then with the criminal organization prosecution unit.

References
Government of Manitoba news release (accessed June 18, 2008)

Year of birth missing (living people)
Living people
Judges in Manitoba
University of Manitoba alumni
Canadian women judges